The 1943–44 Mexican Primera División season was the 1st season of Mexican professional football. Asturias won its third championship and first professional title.

Team locations

League standings

Results

Championship play-off
A match between Asturias and España was held to determine the champion, since both teams ended the season with the same number of points.

Moves

After this season León, Oro, and Puebla joined the league.

Top scorers

References

1943-44
Mex
1943–44 in Mexican football